Francesca Di Lorenzo and Ronit Yurovsky were the defending champions, but decided not to compete together. Di Lorenzo partnered with Ingrid Neel, but lost in the semifinals to Kimberly Birrell and Caroline Dolehide. Yurovsky partnered with Alexa Guarachi, but lost in the first round to Di Lorenzo and Neel.

Hiroko Kuwata and Valeria Savinykh won the title, defeating Birrell and Dolehide 6–4, 7–6(7–4) in the final.

Seeds

Draw

References
Main Draw

Winnipeg National Bank Challenger
Winnipeg Challenger